York North is a provincial electoral district for the Legislative Assembly of New Brunswick, Canada.  It was first created in the 1973 out of the old two member district of York by taking those parts of York County outside the city of Fredericton and north of the Saint John River.  The districts boundaries were significantly altered in 1994 — losing the villages of Nackawic, Millville and surrounding communities — and its name was changed to Mactaquac as a result.  In 2006, its boundaries were restored to nearly its original configuration and though the Electoral Boundaries Commission did not recommend a name change, the legislature later took the decision to revert it to its original name as well.

Members of the Legislative Assembly

Election results

York North (2006–2014)

Mactaquac

York North (1974–1995)

References

External links 
 The Legislative Assembly of New Brunswick

New Brunswick provincial electoral districts